The term "National Treasure" has been used in Japan to denote cultural properties since 1897,
although the definition and the criteria have changed since the introduction of the term. The crafts items in the list adhere to the current definition and have been designated National Treasures according to the Law for the Protection of Cultural Properties that came into effect on June 9, 1951.

The items are selected by the Ministry of Education, Culture, Sports, Science and Technology based on their "especially high historical or artistic value". The list presents 132 entries from Classical to early modern Japan, spanning from the 7th century Asuka to the 18th century Edo period. The number of items is higher, however, since groups of related objects have been joined as single entries. The listed objects are of many types and include household goods, objects related to Buddhism, armour and harnesses. Some of the oldest objects were imported from China at the time.

The listed items consist of materials such as wood over clay or to bronze. Often the articles were decorated using a variety of artistic techniques like gilding of precious metals, line engraving, maki-e, mother of pearl inlay or lacquer. The objects are housed in Buddhist temples, Shinto shrines or museums.

The objects in this list represent about half of the 254 National Treasures in the category "crafts". They are complemented by 110 swords and 12 Japanese sword mountings National Treasures of the List of National Treasures of Japan (crafts: swords).

Statistics

Usage
The table's columns (except for Remarks, Type and Image) are sortable pressing the arrows symbols. The following gives an overview of what is included in the table and how the sorting works. Not all tables have all of the following columns.
Name: name as registered in the Database of National Cultural Properties
Artist: name of the artist if known
Remarks: additional information such as style, special materials, techniques or notable owners
Date: period and year; the column entries sort by year. If the entry can only be dated to a time-period, they sort by the start year of that period
Type: general nature of object, main materials and dimensions
Present location: "temple/museum/shrine-name town-name prefecture-name"; column entries sort as "prefecture-name town-name temple/museum/shrine-name"
Image: a picture of the item

Treasures

Pottery 
Japanese pottery is one of the country's oldest art forms dating to the neolithic period, and some of the world's oldest earthenware from about 14,000 BC has been discovered in Japan. Early pottery objects were made of clay, unglazed and without ornamentation. Later, during the Jōmon, Yayoi and Kofun periods, simple patterned designs and molded ornamentations were added. Such early techniques were formed by coiling or scratching and firing pieces at low temperatures. High-fired Korean Sue ware, and with it the pottery wheel, arrived in Japan around the 6th century, marking the beginning of major technological advances imported from the mainland. Stoneware originated in Japan with the development of green-glazed and other color glazed pottery in the second half of the 7th century. The oldest item in this list is a green-glazed funerary pot from the 12th century.

The popularity of the tea ceremony among the ruling class had a significant influence on ceramic production. To satisfy the demand for high quality pottery items necessary to the tea ceremony a large number of celadon vases and tenmoku ash-glazed teabowls initially were imported from China from the mid-11th to the 16th centuries. These imported items were copied and produced locally at the Seto kiln in Owari Province. Around the mid-16th century adjacent Mino took over as a production center of conservative Chinese inspired Seto style pottery. The Japanese invasions of Korea from 1592 to 1598, and subsequent relocation of Korean potters to Kyushu, brought new pottery styles to Japan. From the late-16th century, Mino potters developed new, distinctly Japanese techniques such as Shino ware or Raku ware. This was also motivated by a general shift of tastes among teamasters and others, who came to prefer simpler unglazed tea bowls formed by hand rather than on a pottery wheel. Of the 14 pottery items in this list, eight entries are chawan bowls used in the tea ceremony, three are flower vases, one is an incense burner, one a tea-leaf jar and one a funerary pot. Eight objects originated in China, five in Japan and one in Korea.

Japan

China, Korea

Metalwork 
Bronze and iron casting were introduced to Japan from the mainland in the Yayoi period, initially bringing to Japan from Korea and China iron knives and axes, and later bronze swords, spears and mirrors. Eventually all of these and other metal objects were produced locally.

Mirror icons 
Mirror icons or kyōzō (鏡像) are drawings on the surface of a mirror. They first appeared around the mid-Heian period and are a representation of honji suijaku, fusing Buddhist deities with local Shinto kami. Three early mirror icons with line engravings of various deities have been designated as National Treasures.

Temple bells 
The introduction of Buddhism to Japan in the mid-6th century led to the development of large hanging bronze bells without a clapper rung with a mallet or hanging beam. They are generally suspended in dedicated bell towers or shōrō. The oldest extant of these bells date to the late-7th century and have been designated as National Treasures. The bells were either engraved or cast in relief, with outer surfaces showing vertical and horizontal relief bands, a boss ornament on the upper wall that sometimes included text, and handles typically shaped in a dragon motif. Thirteen Japanese and one Korean temple bell have been designated as National Treasures.

Buddhist items 
A variety of Buddhist metal implements and objects have been designated as 19 National Treasures. These include five decorated bronze or copper gongs, struck with wooden sticks during Buddhist rituals, a set of flower baskets (keko) used in the Buddhist flower-scattering ritual, six pagoda shaped reliquaries, an incense burner, a sutra container, a bowl for offerings, a banner for ceremonial use, the finial of a pilgrim's staff and two sets of implements used in Esoteric Buddhism.

Mirrors
Bronze mirrors arrived to Japan from China as early as the Yayoi period and continued to be imported through the Tang dynasty (618–907). During that period mirrors cast in Japan were imitations of Chinese prototypes and subsequently Japanese designs were established. All of these mirrors were generally circular, with a polished front, and a back decorated with molded or engraved reliefs, sometimes inlaid with gold or silver. Three mirrors or sets of mirrors decorated with floral and animal motifs have been designated as National Treasures.

Others 
Six National Treasures made of metal are not covered by the above categories. They are two gilt bronze lanterns, a plaque, a pair of phoenix sculptures, a pitcher and a calligraphy set consisting of a water dropper, spoons and an ink rest.

Lacquer 
Japanese lacquerware has a long history, back as far as the Jōmon period, because of decorative value and the quality as protective finish. Initially lacquer was used to enhance properties of utilitarian objects such as watertight drinking vessels, cooking and household goods. The oldest extant decorated item dates to the 6th century; in the medieval and early modern period lacquer was used in the manufacture of many products such as toiletry boxes, inkstone cases, eating utensils, plates, bowls, containers, furniture, saddles, stirrups or armour.

Lacquerware is produced in a three-step process: first the base is prepared. Most often the base consists of wood, but it can also be of paper or leather. Next is the application of lacquer, which hardens while drying, thereby sealing the base. Generally several layers of lacquer are applied. The lacquer is then decorated with a variety of methods. In the maki-e technique, a powdered metal (usually gold or silver) is sprinkled on the lacquer before completely hardened. This technique was developed and popular in the Heian period but continued to be used with refinements into the early modern period. Over the next centuries various other methods that employ precious metals were developed, such as the ikakeji technique originating in the Kamakura period in which a finely ground gold powder was spread in sufficient quantities to mimic solid gold. The use of metallic powders was complemented with other techniques such as polished shell inlay or gold leaf (kirikane). The former was used in the Heian and Kamakura periods and popular motifs included water, rocks, trees or flowers. Starting in the Kamakura period, larger and more solid objects such as toiletry chests were decorated with realistic images. Towards the end of the medieval period (late-16th century), simpler designs were favoured in decorations. Honami Kōetsu who lived around this time is the earliest lacquer artist known by name.
Japanese lacquerwork reached its apogee in the 17th century Edo period when lacquer was used for decorative objects as well as everyday items such as combs, tables, bottle, headrests, small boxes or writing cases. The most famous artist of this time was the lacquerer painter Ogata Kōrin. He was the first to use mother of pearl and pewter in larger quantities for decorating lacquerware.

Buddhist items 
Eleven items related to Buddhism, including four boxes for sutra scrolls made with a wood or leather base, two miniature shrines, one table, a jewel box, a box for a monk's robe (kesa ), a palanquin and a Buddhist platform, have been designated as lacquered Buddhist National Treasures. With one exception all of these items date to the Heian period.

Mikoshi 
Two 12th-century lacquer-coated mikoshi, portable shrines for use in festivals of Shinto shrines have been designated as National Treasures.

Harnesses 
Saddles were made of wood and were designed as a standing platform for archers. They were not suited for riding long distances or at high speed. Early saddles of the Nara period were of Chinese style karagura and later modified for local tastes, resulting in Japanese style saddles from the Heian period onward. Artisans and carpenters became involved in the saddle production as saddles became more elaborate in the Kamakura period, with decorations in mother of pearl inlay, gold leaf and multiple coats of lacquer. Saddles ceased to be primarily utilitarian, instead serving as adornment showing the owner's status in processions. Three Japanese style lacquered wooden saddles and a complete set of a Chinese style ritual saddle, dating to the late Heian and Kamakura periods, have been designated as National Treasures.

Furniture, boxes, musical instruments 
Box-like items, including five toiletry cases, two writing boxes, four other boxes, a chest, a zither, an arm rest and a marriage trousseau containing many items of furniture, boxes and others have been designated as 15 National Treasures.

Dyeing and weaving 
By the late 3rd century, sewing, followed later by weaving, was introduced to Japan from Korea. Early textiles were made of simple twisted cords from wisteria, mulberry, hemp or ramie fibres. Following a gift of silk clothes and silk worms from the Chinese court, the Japanese court started to support textile and silk production from the 4th century onward. Chinese and Korean weavers were encouraged to exhibit their fabrics bringing new techniques such as those used to make brocades or delicate silk gauzes. In the 8th century Nara period, Japanese weavers employed a variety of techniques such as tie-dyeing, stenciling, batik, and embroidery. They skillfully imitated continental weaves, including rich damasks, many types of brocades and chiffon-like gauzes. Because of a general change in aesthetics in the Heian period weaving and dyeing techniques became less varied with less colourful brocades, smaller patterns, and less elaborate gauzes. The Japanese aristocracy preferred plain silks over woven or dyed designs.

Armour 
Armour has been employed in battles in Japan since the Yayoi period. Some of the oldest extant items from the 4th to the 7th centuries were excavated from kofun and have been designated as archaeological National Treasures. These ancient armours were of two types: a tight fitting solid plate cuirass (tankō) and a skirted lamellar type (keikō), both believed to be based on Chinese or Korean prototypes. This list includes more recent pieces of armour, developed as result of a trend toward (lamellar) scale armour that began in Japan in the 6th to the 7th centuries and matured in the mid-Heian period (9th to 10th centuries). Combining materials such as leather and silk with iron or steel parts, these armours had the advantage of being light, flexible, foldable and shock absorbent. They were generally lacquered to protect them from the humid climate and were used widely from the late Heian period to the mid-14th century. A complete set consisted of a helmet, mask, neck guard, throat protector, breastplate with shoulder guards, sleeve armour, skirt, greaves, shoes and a pennant attached to the back.

During this time, there were two popular kinds of armour: the ō-yoroi (lit. "great armour") with a boxlike appearance, mainly worn by high-ranking samurai on horseback, and the lighter and more flexible dō-maru that wrapped around the body and was initially worn by lower-ranking foot soldiers. The ō-yoroi was made of leather and iron lames bound together in horizontal layers, ornamented and reinforced with leather, silk and gilt metal. It originated around the 10th century but was only commonly used starting with the Genpei War at the end of the 12th century. Being the most complete and elaborate Japanese armour, it was also worn for ceremonies. The tighter fitting dō-maru, developed in the 11th century, was generally made of a combination of leather and metal and did not include a solid breastplate or sleeves. In many cases its armour plates were replaced with scales of metal, leather or whalebone laced together with silk or leather cords. Even though it was a plainer armour compared to the ō-yoroi, upper class samurai started to adopt it around 1300, as battles began to be fought on foot favouring a more comfortable suit. Three dō-maru, fifteen ō-yoroi armours and one pair of gauntlets have been designated as National Treasures. Most of the items include a helmet and large sleeve protectors.

Others 
There are 15 craft National Treasures that do not fit in any of the above categories. Six of these are large collections of items of various type offered to shrines and two are sets of Buddhist items such as platforms, canopies or banners.

See also
Nara Research Institute for Cultural Properties
Tokyo Research Institute for Cultural Properties
Independent Administrative Institution National Museum

Notes

References

Bibliography

Crafts
Japanese art
Military history of Japan
Japanese armour